Julio Baraibar (17 October 1945 – 13 November 2022) was a Uruguayan diplomat and politician. A member of the Movement of Popular Participation, he served as Minister of Labor and Social Affairs from 2009 to 2010.

Baraibar died in Montevideo on 13 November 2022, at the age of 77.

References

1945 births
2022 deaths
Movement of Popular Participation politicians
Broad Front (Uruguay) politicians
Ministers of Labor and Social Affairs of Uruguay
21st-century Uruguayan politicians
Politicians from Montevideo